Jamaica sent a delegation to compete at the 2008 Summer Paralympics in Beijing, People's Republic of China. The team consisted of four competitors, all in track and field athletics.

Medallists

The country won one medal, a bronze.

Athletics

See also
Jamaica at the Paralympics
Jamaica at the 2008 Summer Olympics

References

  

Nations at the 2008 Summer Paralympics
2008
Summer Paralympics